Kim Elsberg Moeller, better known as Multiman, is a Danish-American record producer and songwriter.

He has worked with or produced and remixed for names like J. Lewis featuring Flo Rida, Backstreet Boys, Randy Crawford  and Ruff Endz. In addition, he wrote the most played pop single in 2003 in Denmark, Every little part of me, for Danish idol Julie, which went x 4 platinum and stayed number 1 on the charts for more than 14 weeks in a row. Was the exclusive producer and writer in a 2-year collaboration (2006–2007) with Texas native R&B singer Brandon Beal on his album Comfortable released in 2008

Discography

References

 http://www.discogs.com/artist/Multiman

1958 births
Living people
American record producers
Danish record producers
Danish songwriters
English-language singers from Denmark